The 2021 European Youth Orienteering Championships was an edition of the European U16 and U18 Orientering Championships, organised by the International Orienteering Federation. It was held in Vilnius, Lithuania from 19–22 August 2021.

Medal overview

Men

Women

Medal table

Participating countries
29 countries participated.

References

External links 
Official website 

European Orienteering
European Championships, Youth
International sports competitions hosted by Lithuania
European Orienteering Youth Championships
Sports competitions in Vilnius
Orienteering in Lithuania
European Youth Orienteering Championships